Yar-Sale is a rural locality (a selo) in Russia located east of Salekhard near the Gulf of Ob in the northern part of Western Siberia.  It is the administrative center of Yamalsky District, one of seven in Yamalo-Nenets Autonomous Okrug of Tyumen Oblast.

History
Yar-Sale was founded in 1927, and in 1932 became the center of Yamalsky District. The village's name us from the local Nenets yar, meaning "sandy" and sale, meaning "cape".

On 2 October 1989, an Aeroflot Antonov An-2T (registration CCCP-33078) flying over the Yamal Peninsula performed a forced landing in the tundra near Yar-Sale, causing irreparable damage to the aircraft's landing gear, propeller and wings.

Demographics

As of the 2010 Census, Yar-Sale had 6,486 inhabitants including 3,115 men (48.0%) and 3,371 women (52.0%), accounting for 39.8% of Yamalsky District's total population of 16,310.  The village had grown from the previous 2002 Census, which recorded 4,872 inhabitants including 2,291 men (47.0%) and 2,581 women (53.0%).

Economy and infrastructure
In recent decades, Yar-Sale grew in connection with the development of natural gas fields in the region. The village also sustains a local trade in processing reindeer, with products sold locally and exported to Germany.  There is a museum of local lore in the village.

Transportation
Yar-Sale Heliport (ICAO airport code: USDR) consists of two helipads: one north and one east of the settlement with the terminal building situated within the actual settlement. 

There is regular water and air communication with Salekhard, but land travel is irregular during the rasputitsa seasons.

References

Populated places established in 1927
Rural localities in Yamalo-Nenets Autonomous Okrug
1927 establishments in Russia